Vladimir Petrovich Voronkov (20 March 1944 – 25 September 2018) was a Russian cross-country skier who competed in the late 1960s and early 1970s, training at the Armed Forces sports society in Moscow. He won the 4 x 10 km gold at the 1972 Winter Olympics in Sapporo for the USSR. Voronkov also finished 4th in the 30 km event at the 1968 Winter Olympics in Grenoble

He also won a gold medal at the 1970 FIS Nordic World Ski Championships in the 4 x 10 km relay.

References

External links
 
 

1944 births
2018 deaths
Olympic cross-country skiers of the Soviet Union
Olympic gold medalists for the Soviet Union
Soviet male cross-country skiers
Russian male cross-country skiers
Cross-country skiers at the 1968 Winter Olympics
Cross-country skiers at the 1972 Winter Olympics
Armed Forces sports society athletes
Olympic medalists in cross-country skiing
FIS Nordic World Ski Championships medalists in cross-country skiing
Medalists at the 1972 Winter Olympics
People from Komsomolsky District, Chuvash Republic
Sportspeople from Chuvashia